Ali Al-Zubaidi  (born December 17, 1986) is a Saudi football player who plays as a midfielder for Tuwaiq.

References

1986 births
Living people
Saudi Arabian footballers
Ittihad FC players
Najran SC players
Al-Faisaly FC players
Al-Orobah FC players
Hajer FC players
Al-Kawkab FC players
Al-Washm Club players
Al-Okhdood Club players
Al-Rayyan Club (Saudi Arabia) players
Tuwaiq Club players
Place of birth missing (living people)
Saudi First Division League players
Saudi Professional League players
Saudi Second Division players
Association football midfielders